York (1770–75 – after 1815) was an American explorer and historic figure, being the only African-American member of the Lewis and Clark Expedition; he participated in the entire exploration and made significant contributions to its success.  He was the first African American to cross the continent and see the Pacific. He has become an American icon and several monuments depicting him have been erected honoring his legacy.

York was born enslaved, the son of Old York and Rose, who were owned by John Clark III, William Clark's father. William inherited York from his father in 1799. He was about the same age as Clark, perhaps a few years older or younger, and naturally strong. His skin was dark: he was "black as a bear", said one who knew him, and his hair was short and curling.
Like most of the enslaved, York was illiterate, and information about him is scanty.

York expected to be given his freedom after the successful expedition was over, in view of what he called his "immense services", but Clark refused repeatedly and got angry with York when he would not go back willingly to his pre-expedition role of submissive body servant. He expressed irritation also at York's insistence on remaining in Louisville, where his wife and possibly children were. He whipped York and eventually sold him.

Documentation concerning York is lacking for the years immediately following. About 20 years later, Clark told Washington Irving that he had freed York and set him up in business, giving him six horses and a large wagon to start a drayage business moving goods between Nashville and Richmond. However, according to Clark as reported by Irving, York was lazy, would not get up in the morning, did not take good care of his horses, longed to return to slavery, and died of cholera.

Historians have called this account by Clark self-serving and suspect. A fur trader who wrote a memoir told of meeting twice "a negro man" living among the Crow Indians in what is today Wyoming, who said that he first came there with Lewis and Clark. He was living very well among the Crow, who treated him as a chief; he had four wives. Historians regard the fur trader's report as reliable, but who the Black man was has been the subject of much discussion. A growing number of historians, but by no means all, believe that it was York.

Early life 
York was born in Caroline County near Ladysmith, Virginia. His skin was dark colored. He and several members of his family were owned by the Clark family.  The will of John Clark III (father of George Rogers and William Clark) states:I give and bequeath to my son Edmund... three slaves, to wit Peter (Vegas child), and Scipio and Darathy (Rose's children)...

I give and bequeath to my son William... one black man named York, also old York and his wife Rose, and their two children, Nancy and Juba; also three old negroes, Tame, Cupid and Harry.The most plausible family tree based on this description and others is that York was the son of Old York, not by Rose, that Scipio (also spelled Sippo, Seppo, Sep, and Pipo, likely named the same as the Roman general Scipio Africanus) and Daphny (also spelled Dafney, Daphney, and Daphne) were Rose's children not by Old York, and that Nancy and Juba were Old York and Rose's biological children. This would make Scipio, Daphney, Juba, and Nancy the half-siblings of York.

William Clark called York his "playmate". He was Clark's "body servant".

The name "Ben" 
There is a single, unsupported oral report, from 1965, that York also had the name Ben. The name never appears in any of the many records of the Lewis and Clark expedition, nor in any other document.

On the expedition 

York "participated fully in the journey and contributed in significant ways to its success." The records of the well-documented trip do not reveal any racial bias against him. For all intents and purposes, York's role in Lewis and Clark's Corps of Discovery was equal to that of the expedition's white men. He could swim, which many of the troupe could not. He was allowed to use a rifle, something the enslaved were not ordinarily permitted. When a decision had to be made, York's vote counted equally with those of the white men. There were none of the enslaved's usual restrictions on movement. York could have run away, but chose not to.

A modern writer has called York indispensable to the expedition. The journals are peppered with references to York's hunting prowess: he shot buffalo, deer, and geese alike. His use of a rifle is highly unusual and shows the trust expedition members had in him. His skill in hunting with a rifle may have antedated the expedition. He also kept his eye out for new species, which the expedition was searching for. He played a major role in the heavy work of paddling upstream, portaging, and building shelters. He aided in navigating trails and waterways.

York and Native Americans 
York's most spectacular contributions were with the Native American tribes the expedition came into contact with, whose assistance was sometimes very necessary. According to the journals of the expedition, York's blackness served as a passport with them; they were impressed by such a "strange creature". According to Richard Betts, he was "the main attraction in Lewis and Clark's travelling magic show." York was a sensation.

The following excerpts are from the expedition's official report:

York is not mentioned by name, but at their 1805–06 winter camp on the Columbia River, Indians brought their women to market "for a fishinghook or a string of beads", resulting in cases of "venereal disease".

The memory of York persisted in Indian oral tradition until the 20th century.

Arriving at the Pacific and voting 
On November 18, 1805, York accompanied Clark to a tree at Cape Disappointment State Park, Washington, where Clark added his name to Lewis's and carved in the tree "By Land from the U. States in 1804 & 1805". York became the first American Black man to reach the Pacific Ocean when he walked nineteen miles (30 km) from their camp with Clark. In late November, all the members of a party, including York and Sacagawea, were consulted by the leaders where to camp for the winter. According to Martin Plamondon II, to call this a vote, as it is often called, is to create a myth; there is no implication that the vote of the majority would be followed. He calls it "polling" rather than voting. In a reply, Dayton Duncan notes that Clark wrote down the views on the question of every member of the expedition, including York and Sacagawea. This was itself very unusual. The men believed that they, not the leaders, had made the decision. According to Duncan, it was a vote. Glen Kirkpatrick disagrees.

Mentions in Clark's journal 
A search for the name York in the Lewis and Clark journals produces 135 hits.
 York is first mentioned in Clark's journal on December 26, 1803, when Clark mentions that York and Corporal Whitehouse had been working with the whipsaws, indicating that he was already working with the other men on the expedition.
 Clark mentions York again in his journal on June 5, 1804, noting that York had swum to a sand bar from the keelboat in order to collect some greens for dinner. The majority of the men on the expedition could not swim.
 Clark and another man said that, on June 20, 1804, York almost lost his eye during an assault/altercation when he had sand thrown at him.
 York was mentioned again in Clark's journal after a small party including York descended the Spirit Mound Historic Prairie. Clark said that "York was nearly exhausted by the heat, thirst and fatigue". Clark said this was because York was too fat and unaccustomed to walking quickly.
 On September 1804 it was noted that while on a hunting party York had killed an elk.></ref>f name=":1" /> There is no record of York having trained to use a firearm, which was not generally allowed for slaves.

After the expedition 
All the men of the expedition except York received double pay according to rank, $5 to $30 per month, and each enlisted man was granted  of land. York was enslaved and received nothing.

Contrary to the general belief that Clark freed York immediately after their return, York remained enslaved and the property of Clark for at least five more years. He accompanied Clark on the latter's celebratory visit to Washington D.C. in 1807, and when Clark moved his family to St. Louis to take up his new position as brigadier general of the militia and Superintendent of Indian Affairs in the new territory.

Historian Robert Betts said the freedom York had during the Lewis and Clark expedition made resuming enslavement unbearable. York asked Clark for his freedom based upon his good services during the expedition.

"It is shown that York had gained a little freedom while on the expedition with Lewis and Clark. It is mentioned in journals that York went on scouting trips and going to trade with villages, experiencing freedom while doing that. Clark named two geographic discoveries after him; York's Eight Islands and York's Dry Creek, indicating that Clark may have respected him. When a poll was taken to decide where the group should stay over one winter, York's vote was recorded. He was also able to swim, unlike some of the men who were with them on their expedition."

William Clark's letters to his brother 
In 1988, 47 letters written by Clark to his brother Jonathan were discovered; written between 1792 and 1811, they were published as a volume in 2002. Information concerning York was one of the main surprises in the letters, according to their editor James J. Holmberg. From them we learn the previously unknown fact that York had a wife, and that his marriage antedated the expedition,  which was deliberately made up primarily of unmarried men, like Lewis and Clark themselves. All that is known of his wife is that she was from the Louisville area, where Clark and York lived before the expedition, and that she was owned by someone else. York's attempts to persuade Clark to let him return to the Louisville area led to a serious falling-out between them in 1808.

That year Clark moved to St. Louis, to take up his new duties as US agent for Indian affairs. York and other household members moved with him. By November 1808, Clark was angered by York's refusal to accept the move to St. Louis and repeated requests that he be hired out in Louisville or sold to someone there. As Clark wrote his brother when finally giving in, he decided to

York was sent to work for a strict Louisville nephew, John H. Clark. A few weeks later, Clark mentions York again to his brother:

Clark believed that York would not provide "service" in St. Louis, and this angered him. He wrote his brother again that he would have punished York, and that if he is hired out in Kentucky, it should be with a "Severe Master" so that after  "a while he may do Some Service, I do not wish him again in this Country until he applies himself to Come and give over that wife of his—I wished him to Stay with his family four or five weeks only, and not 4 or 5 months."

York was forced to return to St. Louis, where Clark found him "insolent and sulky". To "mend" this Clark whipped York ("gave him a Severe trouncing"). He put him in jail ("Caleboos", slang Spanish ) in July 1809. By August Clark had decided "to hire or Sell him". This is the last mention of York in the letters written by William Clark. A 1811 letter from a Louisville relative reported that "I don't like him nor does any other person in this country", and also that the owner of York's wife was going to move to Natchez, Mississippi.  York was hired out as a wagoner, making deliveries in Louisville; the last reference to him is from 1815. Another report has him transporting goods between Nashville and Richmond.

Washington Irving's report 
None of the above was known by the general public in the 19th and 20th centuries. During that long period, the version best known of York has been that of Washington Irving. By then a successful writer, Irving visited Clark at his home near St. Louis in 1832. York came up in their conversation: perhaps Irving asked about him, as calling York "the hero of the expedition" is something he did not get from Clark. As reported by Irving:

Historians have been unable to verify any of this. Manumission of a slave was a formal process that produced documents; no document is known confirming that Clark ever freed York. According to Darrell Millner, it is all third-hand, and York's alleged desire to return to slavery "lacks historical foundation". Clark's story is self-serving and reflects pro-slavery arguments that Africans were happy to be slaves, and could not lead successful lives as free people. It is "all too pat", and it is "much more likely" that York was never freed.

The Black man living with the Crow Indians 
Zenas Leonard was a fur trader who in 1839 published a memoir of his travels over several years throughout the upper West. Modern scholars consider it highly reliable. (He was the first to see and publish a description of the huge trees we call redwoods.) He reported meeting twice, once outbound  and again when returning, "a negro man" living well among the Crows of what is today north-central Wyoming. No one questions Leonard's report that he met this man and reported on him accurately. The question is the identity of the Black man, who said he had returned from St. Louis after first visiting the area with Lewis and Clark.

Passages talking of the Black man

Passage 1 (1832) 
In this village we found a negro man, who informed us that he first came to this country with Lewis & Clark—with whom he also returned to the State of Missouri, and in a few years returned again with a Mr. Mackinney 
 a trader on the Missouri river, and has remained here ever since—which is about ten or twelve years. He has acquired a correct knowledge of their manner of living, and speaks their language fluently. He has  to be quite a considerable character, or chief, in their village; at least he assumes all the dignities of a chief, for he has four wives, with whom he lives alternately. This is the custom of many of the chiefs.

Passage 2 (1834) 
On the return, Leonard met the same man again, in 1834:

Passage 3

Proposed identities for the Black man Leonard met

Edward Rose 
Edward Rose was a fur trapper who lived for three years among the Crow and spoke their language. He was employed by Europeans as guide and interpreter. However, in a letter that only appeared in the late 1930s, Rose was killed by Indians during the winter of 1832–33, which means he could have not have been the black man Leonard saw in 1834. In addition, Rose's father was white and his mother was half Black and half Cherokee, so he was not "a negro man".

James Beckwourth 
James Beckwourth, who left us a lengthy autobiography, was a former slave who lived among the Crow much of the time between 1829 and 1836. However, Leonard refers to an "old negro", and Beckwourth was born in 1798 or 1800, so he would have been in his early 30s when Leonard came in contact with the old negro; according to Betts, this "all but rules him out". Also, he would have been a small child at the time of the Lewis and Clark expedition of 1803–1806, and could not have been part of it. While Beckworth claims to have led the Crows' attack on the Blackfoot described by Leonard, he was "notorious" for "just plain lying" and claiming others' deeds as his own. He was called a humbug by one who knew him. "I knew Jim intimately and he was the biggest liar that ever lived." In addition, he was not negroid in appearance. His father was white, and the ethnicity of his mother is not known, but she may well have been no more than half or a quarter Black (quadroon). He never described himself as Black, and he "resembled an Indian so much as to pass for one." Three people who saw him did not realize he was of mixed blood; they thought he was white. "On the basis of both age and appearance, Beckwourth having been Leonard's 'old negro' simply does not stand up."

John Brazeau 
Without any explanation or documentation, in a study of black fur traders John Brazeau, "a black war leader among the Sioux", is stated to be the man. "It was very likely that Brazeau told Zenas Leonard that he had come west with Lewis and Clark. As far as anyone can tell, Brazeau was telling a bald faced lie, probably for fun." A John Brazeau was an employee of the American Fur Company and founded Braseau's Houses, a trading post on the Yellowstone River. Frank Grouard, an interpreter, a "strange character", was said to have been "the son of an American Fur Company employee named John Brazeau. (John Brazo, you may remember, was the man hired by Kenneth McKenzie, bourgeois at Fort Union, to shoot a man who had threatened his life.)"

York 
The man described by Leonard, who is never named and presumably did not want his name known, fits York's description in size, complexion, and age. Besides the statement that he was big, the only thing known about York's appearance is that his skin was very dark. He was a Black man, which neither Rose nor Beckwourth was. The man's success and comfort living with the Crows fits York completely. After his wife was taken to Natchez, York no longer had a reason to remain in Louisville, and he was quite upset at Clark's refusal to grant him his freedom, given his "immense services" during the expedition.

Legacy 

There is no doubt that York played a vital role while reading through the journals written during the expedition. Not only did he fulfill his duties as a laborer along the expedition, the journals also suggest that the color of York's skin intrigued the Native tribes so much they seemingly gave the expedition a pass through the land as well as commencing with trade. The journals also suggest that York had gained the respect of many of the men who were part of the expedition as well.

The Sambo and the superhero 
Darrell Millner has studied how York has been shaped and presented over 200 years. He classifies scholarly treatment of York into what he calls two broad categories: the Sambo school, which has been the main trend until very recently, and the superhero school.

The Sambo version of York presents him as a happy slave, but, like all slaves, much in need of a white owner to run his life better than he could himself. In the Sambo tradition, York is neither manly nor heroic, qualities only whites can have. His role and contributions are systematically reduced to behavior that was considered fitting and appropriate for a negro, ignoring the positive aspects of York's character and his contributions, distorting some incidents to cast them in the most unfavorable light possible, and projecting onto York unsubstantiated qualities, such as a thick "Negro" dialect and an insatiable sexual appetite.

In contrast, the superhero presentation of York has elevated him "to near superhuman status and his contributions to the expedition were unsurpassed by others in the Corps of Discovery. The superhero York is the quintessential role model, a courageous, ingenious, brave, and self-sacrificing black hero who has overcome all of the obstacles that slavery and a hostile frontier threw at him. This York ultimately prevails; he is a figure not only for blacks to admire but also for them to emulate."

Creative works based on York 
 In 1972, one of the six sections of Peter Michaelson's poem/essay "Bestride the Mighty and Heretofore Deemed Endless Missouri: An Essay on the Corps of Discovery", deals with York.
 In 1999, Kentucky actor and writer Hasan Davis evoked York through the Kentucky Humanities Council's Chautauqua Living History program. As the Bicentennial Commemoration of the Lewis and Clark Expedition neared, Davis was invited to share York's story along the trail and across the nation as part of the national retelling of the expedition and its impact on the nation, native communities, and future generations.
 As part of the Lewis and Clark bicentennial celebrations of 2003, the opera York was presented at the Penn State Opera Theater. Composer was Bruce Trinkley and librettist was Jason Charnesky.
 A one-man play, York, was created by playwright Bryan Harnetiaux in collaboration with actor and African drummer David Casteal, and premiered at Spokane Civic Theatre, Spokane, Washington, on April 29, 2005, directed by Susan Hardie and performed (with African drumming) by Casteal. According to author Harnetiaux, "One element you see is the affinity between York’s African drumming experience and the Native American drumming". There were off-Broadway performances in New York City in July 2006, and a short production run in 2008. In commemoration of Black History Month, the play was again presented in Spokane on February 27–28, 2016, again with David Casteal. It was repeated February 2, 2018.
 Kentucky poet Frank X Walker has written two books of poetry about York: Buffalo Dance: The Journey of York (2004), and When Winter Come: The Ascension of York (2008). According to the publisher, the University of Kentucky Press, "This collection of persona poems tells the story of the infamous Lewis & Clark expedition from the point of view of Clark's personal slave, York. The poems form a narrative of York's inner and outer journey, before, during and after the expedition—a journey from slavery to freedom, from the plantation to the great northwest, from servant to soul yearning to be free." The books were very well received: "Singly and together, these books are a great success: they portray the complex character of York, [and] they enrich our understanding of an important chapter in American history", wrote William Joliff in a review article.

In his novel Little Big Man, Thomas Berger mentions York as having possibly been the father of some dark-skinned Indians.

Honors (in chronological order) 

 York appears in several paintings by Western artist Charles Marion Russell. In the painting commonly known as Lewis and Clark meeting the Mandan Indians, 1897, York is well and distinctively dressed. In the painting Louis and Clark on the Lower Columbia, 1905, he is seen from the back, working, and in plain slave clothing. In York, 1908, no European Americans are present. York meets with Native Americans, who are curious about him, examining his dark skin.
 "Bilalian Odyssey", by Isaka Shamsud-din (1983) "transfers York from the periphery to the center of the dramatic story of which he is a part."
 In 1988, the sculpture The Naming of Mt. Jefferson, by Michael Florin Dente, was erected on the campus of the University of Portland. It portrays William Clark, York, and an unnamed Native American. According to the artist, the work stands as "a visual reminder that three races contributed to the success of the Lewis and Clark Expedition—symbolic of the first integrated society in the Oregon country." In 2020, the statue of York was removed from the sculpture.
 In July 1989, a statue group by sculptor Bob Scriver, "Explorers at the Portage", was erected in Overlook Park in Great Falls, Montana. It depicts Meriwether Lewis, William Clark, York, and the expedition's dog, Seaman, surveying the junction of the Missouri and Sun rivers. Scriver donated a copy of the work, now with  Sacagawea added (photo above), to the Lewis and Clark National Historic Trail Interpretive Center, located near the city on the Crooked Falls of the Great Falls of the Missouri River.
 In 1989, the Oregon Historical Society commissioned Richard Haas to create eight-story-high murals for the former Sovereign Hotel, which at the time it owned. One mural depicts the people of the Lewis & Clark Expedition, including York and Sacagawea.
 York's Stripes, by Porter Williams, 1998, shows the stripes of York's whipping on his back. link
 In 2000, Yorks Islands was accepted by the U.S. Board of Geographic Names as designation for an archipelago of islands in the Missouri River in Broadwater County, Montana, which were named for York by the Lewis and Clark Expedition. The privately owned islands were called by Clark "York's 8 Islands", but have since become known as "York's Islands" or simply "Yorks Islands". A small tributary of the Yellowstone River was also named for York.
 Western artist Michael Haynes in 2000 produced "Proud Hunter", an illustration of York alone, carrying a small deer. link
 2000: Eugene Daub, Lewis and Clark Statue, at Clark's Point, in Case Park on Kansas City, Missouri. Depics Lewis, Clark, York, Sacajawea, and Seaman. link
 In 2000, York was mentioned on a historical marker at the former location of Mulberry Hill, Clark's family home in Louisville. link
 In 2001, President Bill Clinton posthumously granted York the rank of honorary sergeant in the United States Army.
 In 2001, York was inducted into the Hall of Great Westerners at the National Cowboy and Western Heritage Museum, Oklahoma City, Oklahoma.
 The City Council of Portland in 2002, voted to affirm that "York Street", the origins of which name are unknown, is to be understood as referring to this York.
 In 2003, a statue of York, by sculptor Ed Hamilton, with plaques commemorating the Lewis and Clark Expedition and his participation in it, was placed on Louisville's Riverfront Plaza/Belvedere, next to the wharf on the Ohio River.
 Also in Louisville in 2003, the Kentucky Historical Society and the Kentucky Department of Highways erected a historical marker along the Ohio River. link
 York has a prominent place in the 2005 mural of the expedition by David McClain, in Liberty, Missouri. link
 2008: Lewis and Clark Trailhead Monument,  by Sabra Tull Meyer, Jefferson City, Missouri. Group depicts, left to right, York, Lewis, Seaman, Clark, and interpreter George Druillard. Funding problems had delayed it since 2002.  link
 2010: York: Terra Incognita, a  bronze statue by Alison Saar, was installed on the campus of Lewis and Clark College, in Portland, Oregon. Since we do not know what York looked like, the artist focused instead on the statue's back, making it a focal point. The back is "scarred" with sections of William Clark's maps. The project was begun by four law students.
 In 2021, a  bust of York on a pedestal, which formerly contained a statue of anti-Native American pioneer Harvey W. Scott, was secretly installed in Mount Tabor Park, Portland, Oregon, Attached to the pedestal was a paper plaque describing York's role in the Lewis and Clark expedition. The artist at first was unknown, but he subsequently revealed that he was Todd McGrain. The bust was toppled and seriously damaged in July 2021. A white supremacist group, Patriot Front, is suspected.

Writings about York 
There are no writings by York, as he was illiterate. The bitterness between him and Clark prevented him from telling his story for publication as a slave narrative.
 General
 
 
 
 Screenplay
 
 Children's books

Videos 
 2005: York, the slave of William Clark. 16:34. Produced for the Lewis and Clark Bicentennial by Executive Productions, Seattle.
 2009: Searching for York. 29:01. Oregon Public Broadcasting.

 2017: York: One Man's Story. 6:56. Lewis and Clark National Historical Park.
 2018: York: American's Forgotten Explorer. 18:48. Stefan Milo.
 2020: A Conversation with Hasan Davis: York, Equity, Race and the Lewis and Clark Story. 58:28. Lewis and Clark National Historic Trail, National Park Service.
 2020: York: The African American Man Traveling with the Lewis & Clark Expedition. 8:16. BrightRoad2Success.

 2021: Lewis & Clark State Historic Site, Illinois Department of Natural Resources.
 York Before the Expedition.  9:16.
 Building the Team VII: York On the Expedition. 8:30.
 York After the Expedition 10:40.

See also 

 Estevanico
 List of people from the Louisville metropolitan area
 List of enslaved people
 Shields Green
 Stephen Bishop (cave explorer), another accomplished African-American slave from Kentucky, renowned as an explorer

Further reading 
 Robert Betts, In Search of York: The Slave Who Went to the Pacific With Lewis and Clark. University Press of Colorado, 2000 (revised edition).
 James Holmberg, Dear Brother: Letters of William Clark to Jonathan Clark. Yale University Press, 2002

References

External links 
 Lewis and Clark Journals, Members of the Expedition (U. Nebraska)
 Recognizing York: A Community Initiative. Lewis and Clark College, Portland
 Vote 4 York Black Heritage Stamp 2013, Jackson Davis V

1770s births
19th-century American slaves
19th-century deaths
African-American history in Omaha, Nebraska
African-American history of Oregon
African Americans in the American Old West
Crow tribe
Lewis and Clark Expedition people
People from Caroline County, Virginia
People from Louisville, Kentucky
African-American history of Wyoming
African-American history in Louisville, Kentucky